Scandenoside is any one of several chemical compounds isolated from certain plants, notably Hemsleya panacis-scandens.  They can be seen as derivatives of the triterpene hydrocarbon cucurbitane, more specifically from cucurbitacin F.

They include
 Scandenoside R9, from Hemsleya panacis-scandens.

References 

Triterpene glycosides